WDBX (91.1 FM) is a radio station  broadcasting a Variety format. Licensed to Carbondale, Illinois, United States, the station serves the Marion-Carbondale, Illinois area.  WDBX is owned by Heterodyne Broadcasting Co., a 501(c)3 not-for-profit corporation.

WDBX is a non-profit, community radio station founded by Tom Egert and Gene Turk serving southern Illinois on 91.1 MHz since February 1996.  WDBX is located in Carbondale, Illinois.  With a 3,000-watt signal, WDBX covers all of Jackson and Williamson counties as well as parts of Perry, Franklin, Union, Johnson and Saline counties.

See also
List of community radio stations in the United States

References

External links
 WDBX's official web site
 Daily Egyptian news article, February 7, 1996

Community radio stations in the United States
DBX
Radio stations established in 1996